The Sleepers are two mountain peaks, East Sleeper  and West Sleeper , located within the Sandwich Range Wilderness in Grafton County, New Hampshire.  Part of the Sandwich Range of the White Mountains, they are flanked to the northwest by Mount Tripyramid, to the northeast by Mount Passaconaway, and to the southeast by Mount Whiteface. The Kate Sleeper Trail passes close by both peaks.

Drainage
The southwest side of the Sleepers drains into Slide Brook and Cascade Brook, both of which drain into Avalanche Brook, thence into the Mad River, Pemigewasset River, Merrimack River, and into the Gulf of Maine at Newburyport, Massachusetts. The northeast side of the Sleepers drains into Sabbaday Brook and Downes Brook, which both drain into the Swift River, thence into the Saco River, and into the Gulf of Maine at Saco, Maine. The south end of East Sleeper drains into  the Whiteface River, thence into the Cold River, Bearcamp River,  Ossipee River, and the Saco River.

Hundred Highest
East Sleeper is on the Appalachian Mountain Club's list of the "Hundred Highest" peaks in New England. A maintained trail passes close by the summit, from which an obvious spur path leads to the top.

Kate Sleeper
The peaks are named in honor of Katherine "Kate" Sleeper (1862 – 1949), a local innkeeper who was heavily involved in trail development in the area: 

Kate Sleeper Walden, born in 1862. In 1890, as a single woman, she purchased the old Caleb Brown farm, which she renovated and then opened to the public as the Wonalancet Farm in 1892 to immediate success. Married Arthur Walden. Initiated the Wonalancet Chapel restoration, the forming of the Wonalancet Out Door Club, the introduction of the telephone to the area, served as the first postmaster of the Wonalancet Post Office. Advocated the preservation of great tracts of land that became part of the White Mountain National Forest. She died in 1949.

There is more on Sleeper in the book on the White Mountains "Forest and Crag" by Laura and Guy Waterman.

See also 

 List of mountains in New Hampshire
 White Mountain National Forest

References

External links 
  
  PeakBagger.com: West Sleeper
  PeakBagger.com: East Sleeper
  East Sleeper - FranklinSites.com Hiking Guide
 The life of Kate Sleeper (1862 - 1949), View From the Top

Mountains of New Hampshire
Mountains of Grafton County, New Hampshire
New England Hundred Highest